Larry Hicks may refer to:

 Larry R. Hicks (born 1943), United States District Judge
 Larry S. Hicks, Republican member of the Wyoming Senate